Whistle Town is a Canadian children's television series which aired on CBC Television in the 1958–59 season.

Premise
Danny (Rex Hagon) lives in the fictional Whistle Town with his friend Foster, a puppet (voiced by Jack Mather). The Tuesday episodes are set in the community's toy shop which is owned by Mr. Bean (Larry Beattie) and staffed by his assistant (Jack Mather). Thursday episodes were set in the town's fire station. Other characters included Mr. Haggarty (Hugh Webster), a postman (Claude Rae), Ross (Ross Snetsinger) and Mayor Jacques (Jean Cavall). Alan Crofoot and George Feyer portrayed other roles.

Episodes included musical performances by Jean Cavall and Ed McCurdy. Cartoons and news films were included with songs and sketches.

Production
John and Linda Keogh developed the puppetry for the series, including Foster.

Scheduling
The half-hour program was broadcast on Tuesdays and Thursdays at 5 pm from 30 September 1958 until 25 June 1959.

References

CBC Television original programming
1950s Canadian children's television series
1958 Canadian television series debuts
1959 Canadian television series endings
Black-and-white Canadian television shows
Canadian television series with live action and animation
Canadian television shows featuring puppetry